Mihai Roșca (born 26 March 1995) is a Moldavian football defender.

Club statistics
Total matches played in Moldovan National Division: 75 matches - 6 goals

References

External links
 

1995 births
Living people
Footballers from Chișinău
Moldovan footballers
Association football defenders
Moldova youth international footballers
Moldovan Super Liga players
FC Dacia Chișinău players
FC Academia Chișinău players
FC Dinamo-Auto Tiraspol players
Liga II players
FC UTA Arad players
CS Minaur Baia Mare (football) players
Moldovan expatriate footballers
Moldovan expatriate sportspeople in Romania
Expatriate footballers in Romania